Soferet: A Special Scribe is a 2006 television documentary about Aviel Barclay, who studied to become a sofer, which is a traditionally male position transcribing Jewish Hebrew texts. The documentary explains how she became the world's first known traditionally trained female scribe in October 2003. The film explores the importance of the Torah in Jewish life, the perfection required to execute a kosher Torah scroll, and a feminist perspective on the battle waged by some Jewish women to assume responsibilities traditionally reserved for men.

Summary
Barclay was born into a Christian family in Prince George, Canada. As a girl, she enjoyed calligraphy and taught herself the letters of the Hebrew alphabet by the age of 10. She converted to Judaism as an adult and joined the Orthodox Jewish community. The film chronicles Aviel Barclay studying to become a sofer (Jewish scribe) in Orthodox Judaism.

See also
Sofer
Judaism
Torah
Who is a Jew?
Role of women in Judaism

References

External links
Aviel Barclay's website
The producers website

2006 films
American documentary television films
Canadian documentary television films
Israeli documentary films
English-language Canadian films
Documentary films about Jews and Judaism
Documentary films about women and religion
2006 documentary films
Orthodox Judaism and women
Jewish Canadian films
2000s English-language films
2000s American films
2000s Canadian films